Leandro Machado Nascimento (born 22 March 1976) is a Brazilian former footballer who played as a striker.

Other than in his own country, he competed professionally in Spain, Portugal, Ukraine, Mexico, Paraguay and South Korea.

Machado was part of the Brazilian squad at the 1996 Gold Cup.

Club career
Born in Santo Amaro da Imperatriz, Santa Catarina, Machado was just 18 when he made his Série A debut with Sport Club Internacional. After three seasons the 20-year-old moved abroad, signing with Spanish club Valencia CF for 700 million pesetas and first appearing in La Liga on 23 December 1996 when he came on as a second-half substitute for Goran Vlaović in a 3–0 home win over Hércules CF; during his only season he notably scored once against Atlético Madrid (4–1 away success) and twice against Athletic Bilbao (5–2, home), and his team eventually finished in tenth position.

Machado netted ten times for Sporting Clube de Portugal in 1997–98, and the side ranked fourth in the Primeira Liga. On 30 November 1998 he returned to the Spanish top division, appearing rarely for CD Tenerife in a relegation-ending campaign.

Subsequently, safe for three years at Clube de Regatas do Flamengo, Machado rarely settled with a team, playing with Internacional, FC Dynamo Kyiv, C.D. Santa Clara, Querétaro FC, Santos FC and Club Olimpia. He revived his career in South Korea with Ulsan Hyundai FC, scoring a career-best 13 goals in his first year and winning both the K League and the top scorer award in the process.

Machado retired at the age of 32 after a spell with Sport Club do Recife, due to knee problems.

International career
Machado earned the first of his two caps for Brazil during the 1996 CONCACAF Gold Cup, needing only 11 minutes after replacing Sávio to score the final 4–1 in a group stage contest against Canada.

International goals
(Brazil score listed first, score column indicates score after each Machado goal)

Honours

Club
Internacional
Campeonato Gaúcho: 1994

Flamengo
Campeonato Carioca: 1999, 2000, 2001
Copa Mercosur: 1999
Taça Guanabara: 1999
Taça Rio: 2000

Santos
Campeonato Brasileiro Série A: 2004

Sport
Copa do Brasil: 2008
Campeonato Pernambucano: 2008

Dynamo Kyiv
Ukrainian Premier League: 2002–03

Ulsan Hyundai
K League: 2005

Country
Toulon Tournament: 1995

Individual
K League: Top Scorer 2005

References

External links

1976 births
Living people
Sportspeople from Santa Catarina (state)
Brazilian footballers
Association football forwards
Campeonato Brasileiro Série A players
Sport Club Internacional players
CR Flamengo footballers
Santos FC players
Sport Club do Recife players
La Liga players
Valencia CF players
CD Tenerife players
Primeira Liga players
Sporting CP footballers
C.D. Santa Clara players
Ukrainian Premier League players
FC Dynamo Kyiv players
Liga MX players
Querétaro F.C. footballers
Paraguayan Primera División players
Club Olimpia footballers
K League 1 players
Ulsan Hyundai FC players
Brazil international footballers
Brazilian expatriate footballers
Expatriate footballers in Spain
Expatriate footballers in Portugal
Expatriate footballers in Ukraine
Expatriate footballers in Mexico
Expatriate footballers in Paraguay
Expatriate footballers in South Korea
Brazilian expatriate sportspeople in Spain
Brazilian expatriate sportspeople in Portugal
Brazilian expatriate sportspeople in Ukraine
Brazilian expatriate sportspeople in Mexico
Brazilian expatriate sportspeople in South Korea
1996 CONCACAF Gold Cup players